= Anterior surface =

The Anterior surface can refer (among other things) the following:

- Anterior surface of pancreas
- Anterior surface of cervical vertebrae
